USS Lassen may refer to the following ships of the United States Navy:

  was acquired by the US Navy 15 November 1940 and decommissioned 15 January 1947
  is an  launched 16 October 1999 and currently in active service

United States Navy ship names